Eryk Żelazny (born 2 December 1943 in Lubiewo) is a retired Polish runner who specialized in the 800 and 1500 metres.

At the 1970 European Indoor Championships he won a silver medal in medley relay together with Edmund Borowski, Kazimierz Wardak and Stanisław Waśkiewicz. He also competed at the 1966 European Championships and the 1969 European Championships without reaching the final.

References

1943 births
Living people
Polish male middle-distance runners
People from Tuchola County
Sportspeople from Kuyavian-Pomeranian Voivodeship
Zawisza Bydgoszcz athletes